John Richard McCoy (born October 29, 1943) (Tulalip Tribes of Washington) is an American politician of the Democratic Party based in Washington state.  In 2013, he was appointed to the State Senate to fill a vacancy and represents the 38th Legislative District. He previously served more than 10 years in the Washington House of Representatives (2003-2013).

McCoy is the only self-identified Native American in the state senate. In 2013, along with Jeff Morris (Tsimshian), he was one of the two Native Americans in the state legislature.

Early life
McCoy was born into a Tulalip Tribes family on the reservation. He attended local schools.

He spent 20 years in the Air Force before retiring in 1981. He then became a computer technician at the White House, before leaving to start a career in the private sector.

He would later become active in tribal affairs. He served as general manager of Quil Ceda Village, the tribe's new municipality  established in 2001. It included a gaming casino and business park. In 2005 the tribe also opened a 125-store retail outlet, all part of its efforts to diversify the tribe's economy and provide new jobs.

Political career
McCoy had joined the Democratic Party and become active. In 2002 he ran for office as state representative and won. He served from 2003–2013, being re-elected several times.

In his fifth term in the state legislature, McCoy gained passage of a bill to establish a procedure "for the state to cede jurisdiction over criminal and civil matters on tribal lands to federal and tribal governments." In 2013 he was chairman of the Community Development, Housing and Tribal Affairs Committee; vice chairman of the Environment Committee; and member of the Education Committee.

McCoy has also served as chairman of the executive committee of the National Caucus of Native American State Legislators; there are 79 Native legislators in 18 states.

On November 27, 2013, the Snohomish County Council selected McCoy to fill the vacancy left when Senator Nick Harper resigned. McCoy was the leading vote-getter of the Democratic Precinct Committee Officers in Washington's 38th Legislative District. He retired from the State Senate on April 17, 2020, citing concerns about his health, and will be replaced by an appointee until a special election is held in November 2020.

Awards and honors

McCoy received the 2009 Fuse "Sizzle" Award. He was honored with the 'Strong Man Award' for defending a citizens' clean energy initiative - Initiative-937 - from major rollbacks. He brought two sides of the legislature together on the issue to reach a workable compromise.

References

External links
 Washington State Legislature - Rep. John McCoy, official WA House website
 Project Vote Smart - Representative John McCoy (WA) profile, Vote Smart
 Follow the Money - John McCoy
 2006 2004 2002 2000 campaign contributions

1943 births
Living people
21st-century American politicians
Democratic Party members of the Washington House of Representatives
Native American state legislators in Washington (state)
People from Snohomish County, Washington
Tulalip Tribes
Democratic Party Washington (state) state senators